Julián Eduardo Elfenbein Kaufmann (born in Santiago, Chile on July 24, 1972) is a Chilean journalist, radio broadcaster and television presenter.

Career
Julián Elfenbein studied journalism at the Universidad Diego Portales and upon graduation, had a long career in television programs most notably at Televisión Nacional de Chile (TVN), most notably with the entertainment program Pase lo que Pase, as comedian in Ponce Candidato and in Noche de Juegos.

In 2008, he became a co-presenter with Karen Doggenweiler on the reality show Tocando las estrellas (meaning No matter what happens) on Chile's Channel 13. After a break from TV for medical treatment, he returned to sign a deal with Chilevisión (CHV), with successful programs like Primer Plano, Allá tú, Fiebre de baile (Dance Fever), El Poder del 10 and Talento Chileno (Chilean Talent). In 2010, Televisión Nacional de Chile (TVN) announced that he would return to the network as host of the first-ever series of Chilean version Factor X<ref>[http://www.enportada.cl/?p=45997 En Portada: Julián Elfenbein comandará The X-Factor en TVN]  (in Spanish)</ref> of the international The X Factor, and host of Un minuto para ganar, the local version of Minute to Win It.

Television programs

Personal life

Julián Elfenbein is a personality of Jewish descent. In mid-1996, Elfenbein suffered a car accident that killed his girlfriend Soledad Araiza. He lost his father in February 2010. In August 2010, a casual fall during filming of Acoso Textual, he had another serious health issue when he was diagnosed with a brain tumor that required urgent surgery. He has recovered with a return to television amid an outburst of great public support.
 
Elfenbein was married to Daniela Kirberg and is father of three children, Benjamin, Sarah and Rafaela.

Awards
In 2010, Julián Elfenbein won the "best TV presenter" award at the Premios Fotech 2010, with the program he presents Talento Chileno'' winning "Programme of the Year" at the same event.

References

External links

1972 births
Living people
Chilean Jews
People from Santiago
Chilean people of German-Jewish descent
Chilean television presenters
Chilean journalists
Male journalists
Diego Portales University alumni
Chilean television personalities